Goli may refer to:

People
Goli Ameri (born 1956), Iranian-American politician, diplomat and businesswoman from the U.S. state of Oregon
Oliver Dahl-Goli (1897–1976), Norwegian politician for the Christian Democratic Party

Places
Goli, Solukhumbu, Village Development Committee in Solukhumbu District in the Sagarmatha Zone of north-eastern Nepal
Goli, Iran (disambiguation), villages in Iran
Goli otok, island off the northern Adriatic coast in Croatia's Primorje-Gorski Kotar county
Goli Vrh, Gorenja vas - Poljane, dispersed settlement in the Gorenja vas - Poljane Municipality in the Upper Carniola region of Slovenia
Shah-goli, large park in Tabriz
Goli, Uganda, town in Nebbi District, West Nile, northwestern Uganda, close to the border with the Democratic Republic of the Congo

Other
Aakhri Goli, 1977 Bollywood action film directed by Shibu Mitra
Goli Vada Pav, an ethnic Indian snacks and fast food chain store
Goli (dance), a traditional Baoulé masquerade

See also

Golis Mountains
Golis Telecom Somalia

Golis (disambiguation)
Golli (disambiguation)
Egoli (disambiguation), including eGoli